August Pikker (4 February 1889 – 10 March 1976) was an Estonian wrestler. He competed for Russia in the light heavyweight event at the 1912 Summer Olympics.

References

External links
 

1889 births
1976 deaths
Sportspeople from Tartu
People from Kreis Dorpat
Estonian male sport wrestlers
Olympic wrestlers of Russia
Wrestlers at the 1912 Summer Olympics
Russian male sport wrestlers
Estonian emigrants to the United States